Sasson Gabai (or Gabay; ; born ) is an Israeli actor. He is the winner of an Ophir Award, Asia Pacific Screen Award (nominated), European Film Awards and Jerusalem Film Festival in 2007 as Best Actor in the highly acclaimed Israeli film The Band's Visit.

Biography
Gabai was born in 1947 in Baghdad, Iraq, to a Baghdadi Jewish family. During his childhood he immigrated together with his family to Israel. After serving his mandatory military service in the Israel Defense Forces, he studied theater and psychology at the Tel Aviv University. After graduating, he began playing in the Khan Theater in Michael Alfreds group. Afterwards, he played in several stage productions at the Hacameri Theater, the Be'er Sheva Theater and the Beit Lessin Theater. He is one of the permanent staff members at the Beit Lessin Theater. Among the many plays he participated in were Servant of Two Masters, Catch-22, Who's Afraid of Virginia Woolf?, and Rain Man. Gabai also played in the 1989 children's musical Peter Pan as Captain Hook.

Through the years, Gabai played in various Israeli and international films: Sipurei Tel-Aviv;Time for Cherries, for which he won an Ophir award; Rambo III; the Escape from Saudi Arabia; Made in Israel; Aviva, My Love and many others.

Gabai has also been on Israeli television in series The Haim Neighborhood (שכונת חיים), Siton (סיטון), Late Night Stories (סיפורים לשעת לילה מאוחרת), and in the drama series The Kastner Trial (משפט קסטנר) in which he played Rudolf Kastner. He was a host in the comedy series Zehu Ze!, and played a cameo role in the popular comedy series Krovim Krovim, in addition to many other productions.

Career highlights
In 2007 Gabai starred in the critically acclaimed film The Band's Visit, a role for which he won an Ophir Award and a European Film Award. 
In 2008 he played the role of Ahmed Hassan al-Bakr in the American TV mini-series House of Saddam.
In 2009 Gabai began to play the lead role in the TV series Polishuk, a role for which he won an Israeli Television Academy Award in the category of best actor in a comedy series. 
In 2011 he played the lead role in a film Restoration, a role for which he was nominated for an Ophir Award. He won the IFFI Best Actor Award (Male) at the 42nd International Film Festival of India.
 Gabai also played one of the leading roles in the highly acclaimed Israeli TV series Shtisel, which to date, has run for three seasons (2013-2021). Gabai played the role of Nuchem Shtisel, the paternal uncle of the main protagonist, Akiva Shtisel. Nuchem is also the brother of Shulem Shtisel and father of Libbi Shtisel, Akiva's first cousin, and love interest. Nuchem is an Antwerp-based travel agent who shows up at Shulem's apartment with his daughter Libbi, at the beginning of Season 2. One of Nuchem's first lines in the show is when he explains why he is late, blaming the immigration/custom officials at Ben Gurion airport, and calling them Reshaim Arrurim (Yiddish vernacular for "accursed evil people"). Reshaim Arrurim is a line Nuchem reprises to great comedic effect, at the slightest perceived slight, throughout the season.
 It was initially announced on 28 February 2018 that Gabai would reprise his role as Tewfiq in the Broadway adaptation of The Band's Visit in the summer of 2018. The lead producer of The Band's Visit, Orin Wolf, confirmed the news in a press conference on 10 June, following the 72nd Annual Tony Awards (in which The Band's Visit won ten awards, including Best Musical). The news was later confirmed by Broadway.com.
He has acted in at least five different languages: Hebrew, Yiddish, Arabic, English and French.

Filmography

Family 
Gabai resides in Tel Aviv, is married and has five children.

References

External links

1947 births
Living people
Israeli male stage actors
Israeli male film actors
Israeli male television actors
Israeli film directors
Iraqi emigrants to Israel
Israeli Sephardi Jews
Israeli Mizrahi Jews
Iraqi Jews
Israeli people of Iraqi-Jewish descent
European Film Award for Best Actor winners
Tel Aviv University alumni
IFFI Best Actor (Male) winners